Bahan (lit. watchtower) is a kibbutz in central Israel. Located near Bat Hefer, it falls under the jurisdiction of Hefer Valley Regional Council.

History
The kibbutz was established in 1954 by a Nahal gar'in group made up of immigrants from South America. It is named by a biblical word from Isaiah, also there in rare use (f.e. Is 32:14). Its name commemorates also a watchtower near the Jordanian border until 1967. Nearby is an archaeological site named Tel Bahan.

Utopia Park
The kibbutz is the location of Utopia Park, an orchid and tropical flower garden and park.

References

External links
 

Kibbutzim
Kibbutz Movement
Nahal settlements
Populated places established in 1954
Populated places in Central District (Israel)
South American-Jewish culture in Israel
1954 establishments in Israel